"Photoshop Handsome" is a song by British indie pop band Everything Everything. The track was released in the United Kingdom on 25 May 2009 as the second single from the band's debut studio album, Man Alive (2010).

Song meaning 

The song's title refers to the digital editing software Adobe Photoshop and how it has been utilized in the cosmetics industry to alter people's images as a marketing ploy for their products. According to frontman Jonathan Higgs, "Photoshop Handsome looks at the world of digital image manipulation and computer game re-incarnation. What would it feel like to come back to life as one of the 'perfected', false, immortal beings that adorn magazine covers, adverts and games?".

Track listing

Charts 
For the chart week dated 29 January 2011, "Photoshop Handsome" debuted at number one hundred and twenty-nine on the UK Singles Chart—marking the band's third appearance on the chart; following "Schoolin'" (number 152, 2010) and "My Kz, Ur Bf" (number 121, 2010).

Weekly charts

Release history

References 

2009 singles
Everything Everything songs
Songs written by Jonathan Higgs
2008 songs
Geffen Records singles
Songs about the media
Songs about consumerism